Piney Creek Falls is a  waterfall located along Piney Creek, a mile or so above its confluence with Cane Creek. A trail leads an overlook above the falls. There is no trail to the base of the falls which can only be accessed by rappel or a rugged hike up the Piney Creek Gorge. The falls are located near Spencer, Tennessee in Fall Creek Falls State Park.

References

Waterfalls of Tennessee
Waterfalls of Van Buren County, Tennessee